Jordi Dauder i Guardiola (5 March 1938 – 16 September 2011) was a Spanish actor. Dauder was a veteran actor with a prolific career that includes over a hundred films, plays and television series.

He developed to the immense majority of his work in France, where he appeared as actor in productions different from theatre, simultaneously that was taking part in the different political organizations.

Early life and career
Dauder was born in Barcelona, Spain.  After graduating in Arts at the University of Barcelona and History at the University of Paris, where he had to emigrate for political reasons. They began taking their first steps into the theater as well as participating in various social movements that would provide the French revolution of May 1968.

Dauder is one of the side of Spanish cinema forever and participated in La flaqueza del Bolchevique  (2003), of Martin Cuenca; Amor idiota (2004), of Ventura Pons; and La caja (2007).

In Azaña (2007), of Santiago San Miguel, he played President of the Second Spanish Republic Manuel Azaña. On television, one of his most recent roles he has played in the series for TV3 Nissaga de poder (1996).

Catalan was also an actor, voice-dubbing Gregory Peck or Nick Nolte, among others, as well as a writer, author of the novels and short stories and poetry.

Dauder was awarded the Sant Jordi Award for Best Spanish Actor (1991), the Audience Award for Best Catalan Actor (1997), and the Camino the Goya Award for Best Supporting Actor, and Award of the Spanish Actors Union (2009). In 2008, he received the Creu de Sant Jordi.

Death
He died in Madrid on 16 September 2011.

Filmography 

Warsaw bridge (1990)
The Teranyina (1990), for Antoni Verdaguer
The Punyalada (1990)
The febre Gold (1993), for Gonzalo Herralde
El pasajero clandestino (1995), for Agustí Villaronga
El perquè de tot plegat (1995), for Ventura Pons
Land and Freedom (1995), for Ken Loach
Caresses (1997), for Ventura Pons
Els sense nom (1999), for Jaume Balagueró
The flaqueza del Bolshevik (2003)
Amor idiota (2004), for Ventura Pons
Camino (2008), for Javier Fesser
Of Love and Other Demons (2010)
The Monk (2011)

Theatre work 

Medea (1983), for Núria Espert
El último vals (1992), for Samuel Beckett
La Celestina (1996), Fernando de Rojas, per dirigir Hermann Bonnin
El lector por horas (1999) by José Sanchis Sinisterra
El alcalde de Zalamea (2000), for Sergi Belbel
Via Gagarin (2003), Jesús Diez, a Teatre Nacional de Catalunya
Don Gil de las verdes Calzas (2007), for Eduardo Vasco has Teatre Nacional de Catalunya

References

External links 

1938 births
2011 deaths
Male actors from Barcelona
Spanish male film actors
Best Supporting Actor Goya Award winners
Spanish male stage actors
Spanish male television actors
20th-century Spanish male actors
21st-century Spanish male actors